Beikircher is a surname. Notable people with the surname include:

Georg Beikircher (born 1963), Italian bobsledder
Werner Beikircher, Italian luger